Adeva  is an American singer.

Adeva may also mean:
 Adeva!, the 1989 debut album by Adeva
Adeva (moth), genus of moths
Víctor Mongil Adeva, Spanish footballer
Akademische Druck- und Verlagsanstalt (ADEVA), Austrian  book publisher which specializes primarily in the publication of complex facsimile editions